Peer Baierlein (born 16 May 1972 in Stuttgart, West Germany) is a German musician and composer.

Biography 
Peer Baierlein started playing the accordion at the age of 7 and then switched to the trumpet when he was 9. After several years in the local brass band he started his professional studies at the early age of 16 at the Musikhochschule Köln in Germany. He first became a classical trumpet teacher before beginning his studies with Prof. Malte Burba as an orchestra musician at the Musikhochschule Köln and with Arno Lange at the 'Deutsche Oper' in Berlin. 
In 1996, he moved to Leuven in Belgium to study with his favourite jazz-trumpet player Bert Joris at the Lemmensinstituut. Upon completion of his studies, he moved for a year to New York City in 2000, to take lessons form John McNeil and to play his instrument abroad. He then came back to Belgium, where he finished his studies for jazz trumpet and -after that- specialised as ‘lead-trumpet’, also at the Lemmensinstituut. Between 2005 and 2007, Peer Baierlein has been studying classical composition with Piet Swerts. He continued his studies from 2008 - 2011 and followed a special education for composing film music and classical orchestration with a.o. Denis Pousseur, Victor Kissine and Jean-Luc Fafchamps. 
From 2011 - 2013 he was a student for 'new media' at the 'Hochschule für Musik und Theater' in Hamburg.

Since 2007 he works as a musician and composer for the 'Deutsches Schauspielhaus Hamburg', 'Staatstheater Hannover', 'Staatstheater Stuttgart', 'Konzerttheater Bern', 'Centraltheater Leipzig', a.o.

Discography 
2004: Issues
2006: Open Questions
2009: Cycles
2015: One
2015: me² + 1

Works for Orchestra 
2016: 'Concerto No.1' (double concerto for trumpet, trombone and orchestra) 
2016: '255' (double concerto for marimba, vibraphone and orchestra) 
2017: Seelen-Trilogie ('Black Soul','Yellow Soul','Purple Soul' -  for orchestra, voice and rockband) 
2018: Hymnus (for orchestra, organ, 3 choirs, rockband and church bells)
2020: In Der Tiefe (Concerto for DoubleChoir a Capella)
2021: Ode an die Pop-Musik (contemporary compositions based on pop-music motives for nonett and double bass)
2021: Pentagon of Poetry (5 works for vocal-ensemble with lyrics by Goethe, Nietzsche and Lenau.
2022: 'Hymnus an die Musiek' - for Double-Quartet-VocalEnsemble

Opera 
2012: Remixes for Manon from Jules Massenet (Regie: Silvana Schröder / Musical Director: Leo Siberski) / Opera Kiel)
2017: additional compositions for Der Freischütz / Carl Maria von Weber / Eutiner Festspiele / Musical Director: Leo Siberski

Publications 
2017/18: Pyotr Ilyich Tchaikovsky 'Kinderalbum' op.39 / adaptation for string ensemble (Universal Edition)

Orchestrations 
2018: orchestrations of Johann Sebastian Bach, Robert Schumann, Edvard Grieg, Claude Debussy, Georges Bizet, Johannes Brahms, Joseph Haydn and Bedřich Smetana for clarinet, bassoon, violin, bass, trumpet, trombone and percussion
2021: Different orchestrations for the 'WDR Funkhausorchester'

Dance 
2021: Memento (Choreography: Tim Plegge) / 'Hessisches Staatsballett'
2022: Remember The Ladies (Choreography: Xenia Wiest) / 'Mecklenburgisches Staatsballett'
The Little Prince (New adaption / Choreography: Xenia Wiest) / 'Mecklenburgisches Staatsballett' / 'Mecklenburgische Staatskapelle'

Radio Play 
2014: Quotenkiller / (Producer: Klaus-Michael Klingsporn) / Deutschlandradio

External links 
 Homepage Peer Baierlein

German jazz trumpeters
Male trumpeters
Living people
1972 births
21st-century trumpeters
21st-century German male musicians
German male jazz musicians